Foster Botanical Garden, measuring , is one of five public botanical gardens on Oahu. It is located at 50 North Vineyard Boulevard, Honolulu, Hawaii, United States, near Chinatown at the intersection of Nu'uanu Avenue and Vineyard Boulevard. Foster is in a highly urban area with strip malls, schools, and  Buddhist, Shinto, and Methodist religious facilities nearby.

The Garden is the oldest botanical garden in Hawaii, and listed on the National Register of Historic Places.

History
In 1853, Queen Kalama leased  of land to William Hillebrand, a German physician and botanist who built his home and planted trees on the site. During his stay, he introduced a number of plants to Hawaii, as well as deer and mynah birds. Many of the large trees growing today on the Upper Terrace were Hillebrand's plantings. After 20 years Hillebrand returned to Germany, where he published Flora of the Hawaiian Islands in 1888. In 1884 the property was sold to Thomas R. Foster and his wife Mary E. Foster (née Robinson), who continued to develop the garden as their homesite. Upon her death in 1930, Mary Foster bequeathed the land and her home to the City and County of Honolulu, with the provision that the city accept and forever keep and properly maintain the (gardens) as a public and tropical park to be known and called Foster Park.

Dr. Harold Lyon, the first director of Foster Garden, introduced thousands of new plants and trees to Hawaii, and started its famous orchid collection. Taken as a whole, these five gardens feature rare species from tropical environments ranging from desert to rainforest, comprising the largest and most diverse tropical plant collection in the United States.

The Garden is the inspiration for a line in Joni Mitchell's 1970 folk song "Big Yellow Taxi": "Took all the trees, put 'em in a tree museum / Then charge people a dollar and a half just to see 'em.".

Foster Botanical Garden today
Today the garden consists of the Upper Terrace (the oldest part of the garden); Middle Terraces (palms, aroids, heliconias, gingers); Economic Garden (herbs, spices, dyes, poisons); Prehistoric Glen (primitive plants planted in 1965); Lyon Orchid Garden; and Hybrid Orchid Display. It also contains a number of exceptional trees, including a Sacred Fig which is a clone descendant of the Bodhi tree that Buddha sat under for inspiration, a sapling of which was gifted to Mary Foster by Anagarika Dharmapala in 1913. All told, it contains 25 of about 100 Oahu trees designated as exceptional.

The garden also contains several memorials and sculptures: 
 A small replica of the Daibutsu of Kamakura commemorates 100 years of Japanese immigration to Hawaii
 A memorial stone on the site of the first Japanese language school on Oahu, where an anti-aircraft shell exploded into an auditorium full of children during the Japanese attack on Pearl Harbor
 The 1977 abstract ceramic sculpture 'Sandwich Isle' by artist Bob Flint
 The 1974 sculpture Tree by Charles W. Watson

Images

Further reading
 Foster Botanical Garden, undated pamphlet distributed at the garden

See also 
 List of botanical gardens in the United States

References

External links

Information from City of Honolulu on FBG
Photo essay on garden

Honolulu Botanical Gardens
Botanical gardens in Hawaii
Protected areas of Oahu
1853 establishments in Hawaii
Protected areas established in 1853
Historic districts on the National Register of Historic Places in Hawaii
National Register of Historic Places in Honolulu County, Hawaii
Parks on the National Register of Historic Places in Hawaii
Tourist attractions in Honolulu